Neoscaphus simplex is a species of beetle in the family Carabidae, the only species in the genus Neoscaphus.

References

Scaritinae